Factory Floor is the debut studio album by English electronic music band Factory Floor, released on 6 September 2013 by DFA Records. The band produced and recorded the album in Mono House, their North London warehouse.

Track listing

Charts

Release history

References

2013 debut albums
Factory Floor albums
DFA Records albums